Kantee is a Finnish surname. Notable people with the surname include:

Kevin Kantee (born 1984), Finnish ice hockey player
, Finnish civil servant and land surveyor
Ville Kantee (born 1978), Finnish ski jumper 

Finnish-language surnames